Prakash Vijayanath (born 7 November 1994) is a South African badminton player.

Career
Vijayanath was born in India but moved to South Africa when he was four, and started playing badminton at age six in Johannesburg.

In 2013, he was selected among the 14 best African players to be a member of the Road to Rio Project organised by the BWF and Badminton Confederation of Africa, to provide financial and technical support to African players and the lead-up to the 2016 Olympic Games in Rio de Janeiro. He received a Sport Scholarship, supported by Trinity's Global Relations Office studying Computer Science and Business in Trinity College, Dublin. Alongside his studies, he trained at the Badminton Ireland Academy with the Irish high performance squad based at Marino under the guidance of coach Daniel Magee. In August 2013, he won the mixed team gold medal and the men's singles silver medal at the African Badminton Championships. In December 2013, he was the semi finalist at the South Africa International tournament.

In 2014, he was selected to represent South Africa badminton at the Commonwealth Games in Glasgow, Scotland. He became the runner-up of South Africa International in mixed doubles event with his partner Stacey Doubell and the semi finalist of Zambia International tournament in men's singles event.

In 2015, he was nominated for the Badminton World Federation (BWF) Athletes' Commission, to be a bridge between Africa and the global badminton community. "For the success of the BWF Athletes' Commission it is essential to have global representation. African badminton has come a long way and to keep this momentum going it is important to have the support from the global community" he said. In February, he became the semi finalist of Uganda International, and in August–September, he won silver medals in men's singles and mixed team events at the African Games.

In 2018, he made his second appearance at the Commonwealth Games in Gold Coast.

Achievements

All-Africa Games
Men's singles

African Championships
Men's singles

BWF International Challenge/Series
Men's doubles

Mixed Doubles

 BWF International Challenge tournament
 BWF International Series tournament
 BWF Future Series tournament

References

External links
 
 

1994 births
Living people
Sportspeople from Madurai
Indian emigrants to South Africa
South African male badminton players
Badminton players at the 2014 Commonwealth Games
Badminton players at the 2018 Commonwealth Games
Commonwealth Games competitors for South Africa
Competitors at the 2015 African Games
African Games silver medalists for South Africa
African Games medalists in badminton